Anastasi may refer to:

Surname
 Andrea Anastasi (born 1960), Italian volleyball player
 Anne Anastasi (1908–2001), American psychologist
 Giovanni Anastasi (1540–1587), Italian painter
 Giovanni Anastasi (merchant) (1780–1860), merchant and Swedish-Norwegian Consul-General in Egypt
 Maurizio Anastasi, Italian footballer
 Pietro Anastasi (1948–2020), Italian footballer
 Reo Stakis (1913–2001), hotelier born Argyros Anastasis
 Victor Anastasi (1913–1992), Maltese designer and draughtsman
 William Anastasi (born 1933), American painter

Other
 Papyrus Anastasi I, an ancient Egyptian papyrus

See also

Anastasia (surname)
Anastasie
Anastasis (disambiguation)